Ibranum (fl. late 3rd millennium BCE) was the 14th Gutian ruler of the Gutian Dynasty of Sumer mentioned on the "Sumerian King List" (SKL). According to the SKL: Ibranum was the successor of Irarum. Hablum then succeeded Ibranum (likewise according to the SKL.)

See also

 History of Sumer
 List of Mesopotamian dynasties

References

Gutian dynasty of Sumer